Sophie Diana Schmidt (born 28 June 1988) is a Canadian professional soccer player who plays as a midfielder for National Women's Soccer League club Houston Dash and the Canadian national team, with whom she won an Olympic gold medal in 2020 and bronze in both 2012 and 2016. She previously played her club soccer for German club FFC Frankfurt and Sky Blue FC in the NWSL.

Early life
Schmidt was born in Winnipeg, Manitoba, to Elmer and Cornelia Schmidt. Her parents immigrated to Canada from Paraguay before she was born, while her grandparents were originally from Germany. She speaks German fluently and studied German in Portland. She attended W. J. Mouat Secondary School in Abbotsford, British Columbia and played for the Abbotsford Rush club team in 2004. She grew up in a Mennonite community and has described her faith as the most important thing to her.

College career
Schmidt attended the University of Portland and played for the Portland Pilots from 2007 to 2009. She did not play during the 2006 season due to her Canadian national team commitments.

As a second-year student, Schmidt played forward for the Pilots despite having never played the position at a competitive level. She finished the season with seven goals and seven assists in 14 games. Schmidt was fourth in the West Coast Conference in total points (21), sixth in goals and third in assists. She scored the lone goal in a 1–0 NCAA second round win at Colorado. In 2009, Schmidt finished the season tied for first on the team with 12 assists and third on the team with 12 goals. She was named to the Soccer America MVP Team (All-America) First Team, NSCAA First Team All-American, NSCAA All-West Region First Team, and ll-WCC First Team. She ranked ninth in school history for career points per game (1.60) and assists per game (0.46) and tenth in Pilots' history in goals (33) and goals per game (0.58) in 57 matches.

Club career

Early career 
Schmidt played for the Vancouver Whitecaps from 2005 to 2006, alongside former Pilots Christine Sinclair and Tiffeny Milbrett. She appeared and started in eight games for the Whitecaps, recording three assists. In 2011, she played for magicJack in the WPS, followed by a short-term contract with Kristianstads DFF in 2012.

Sky Blue FC 
On 11 January 2013, she joined Sky Blue FC in the new National Women's Soccer League, Schmidt played two seasons with Sky Blue, making 42 appearances and scoring 8 goals.

FFC Frankfurt 
Schmidt signed a one-year deal for German club 1. FFC Frankfurt of the Bundesliga on 31 July 2015. Schmidt left 1. FFC Frankfurt following the 2017–2018 Bundesliga season.

Houston Dash
After three seasons with Frankfurt, Schmidt would sign with NWSL club Houston Dash in 2019. During the 2020 NWSL Challenge Cup Final, she would score a penalty, helping the Dash defeat the Chicago Red Stars for the club's first major trophy. In December 2020, she would re-sign with the Dash through the 2022 season, with the Dash having an option for the 2023 season.

International career
Schmidt has represented Canada at both the U-17 and U-20 level, and captained Canada at the 2006 FIFA U-20 Women's World Championship in Russia. She made her senior debut against Netherlands on 19 April 2005.

In her first World Cup she scored against Ghana on 15 September 2007. She subsequently started all four Olympic matches at Beijing 2008, and played at the 2011 FIFA Women's World Cup. Schmidt and her team won a 2011 Pan American Games gold medal.

On 28 February 2012, Schmidt made her 30th consecutive international appearance in a match against Scotland in Cyprus and had her first two-goal game. Schmidt and her teammates won an Olympic bronze medal at London 2012. She scored two goals in a 3–0 win over Finland at the 2014 Cyprus Cup on 5 March 2014. In August 2016, she won the bronze medal in the 2016 Summer Olympics.

18 February 2021, she played her 200th match for Canada in a 1–0 defeat against the United States in the 2021 SheBelieves Cup. On August 6, 2021, she won the Olympic gold medal in the 2020 Summer Olympics with Canada.

Personal life 
Schmidt became engaged to Nic Kyle, an actor and singer, in September 2017. They married in New Zealand in December 2018.

Career statistics

Club

International goals

Honours
Canada U20

 CONCACAF Women's U-20 Championship: 2008

Canada
 CONCACAF Women's Championship: 2010
Summer Olympics: 2021; bronze medal: 2012, 2016
Pan American Games: 2011
 CONCACAF Women's U-20 Championship: 2008
 Algarve Cup: 2016
 Four Nations Tournament: 2015
Cyprus Cup: 2008, 2011
Individual
 Canadian U-20 Player of the Year: 2007	
 BC Soccer Youth Player of the Year: 2005
 BC Soccer Adult Player of the Year: 2007

See also
 List of women's footballers with 100 or more caps

References

Match reports

External links

 

 Sophie Schmidt at the National Women's Soccer League
 Sophie Schmidt at Sky Blue FC
 
 
 
 
 University of Portland player profile
 Twitter

1988 births
Living people
Soccer players from Winnipeg
Canadian people of German descent
Canadian people of Paraguayan descent
Soccer people from British Columbia
Canadian expatriate women's soccer players
Canadian Mennonites
Canadian women's soccer players
Canada women's international soccer players
Women's association football midfielders
Footballers at the 2011 Pan American Games
Manitoba Bisons soccer players
2011 FIFA Women's World Cup players
2015 FIFA Women's World Cup players
Vancouver Whitecaps FC (women) players
MagicJack (WPS) players
USL W-League (1995–2015) players
Expatriate footballers in Sweden
Expatriate women's footballers in Germany
1. FFC Frankfurt players
Footballers at the 2012 Summer Olympics
National Women's Soccer League players
Olympic soccer players of Canada
Olympic medalists in football
Olympic bronze medalists for Canada
Portland Pilots women's soccer players
NJ/NY Gotham FC players
Houston Dash players
FIFA Century Club
Medalists at the 2012 Summer Olympics
Medalists at the 2016 Summer Olympics
Pan American Games gold medalists for Canada
Footballers at the 2008 Summer Olympics
Footballers at the 2016 Summer Olympics
Footballers at the 2020 Summer Olympics
Canadian expatriate sportspeople in Germany
Canadian expatriate sportspeople in Sweden
Pan American Games medalists in football
Frauen-Bundesliga players
2019 FIFA Women's World Cup players
Damallsvenskan players
Women's Professional Soccer players
Kristianstads DFF players
2007 FIFA Women's World Cup players
Medalists at the 2011 Pan American Games
Medalists at the 2020 Summer Olympics
Olympic gold medalists for Canada